Sandy Zade Hackett (born June 18, 1956) is an American actor, comedian and producer. He is the son of Buddy Hackett. He is best known for playing Joey Bishop in the live production musical, Sandy Hackett's Rat Pack Show.

Hackett is married to Lisa Dawn Miller and is the stepfather of Oliver Richman and father of Ashleigh Hackett. He is the son-in-law of songwriter Ron Miller.

Filmography
 The Fall Guy (1983, TV Series) .... Richard, Carrie's Boyfriend
 Happy (1983, TV Movie) .... Warm-up entertainer
 Hot Dog…The Movie (1984) .... T-Shirt Contest M.C.
 Cannonball Run II (1984) .... Official
 Stitches (1985) .... Student #3
 Hamburger: The Motion Picture (1986) .... Fred Domino
 Joan Rivers and Friends Salute Heidi Abromowitz (1988, TV Special) .... Himself
 Ex-Cop (1993) .... Ronny Witherspoon
 Deadly Games (1996, TV Series) .... Mr. Spencer
 The Nanny (1996–1998, TV Series) .... Rabbi Margulies / Rabbi
 Lovers and Liars (1998) .... Frank
 Jack of Hearts (2000) .... Benny
 The S.I.N. (2001, Video) .... Bud Chelzer
 Las Vegas (2003, TV Series) .... Surveillance #1
 Down and Derby (2005) .... Larry Savage
 The Indie Pendant (2005) .... Roy Patterson
 Hold It Like a Baby (2007) .... Fernando
 The Portal (2010) .... Dr. Mulag

References

External links
 
 Sandy's Official site
 Sandy Hackett's Rat Pack Show
 The Hackett Miller Company

1956 births
Living people
American male film actors
American television actors
William F. Harrah College of Hotel Administration alumni